This is a list of members of the Legislative Assembly of Queensland from 1871 to 1873, as elected at the 1871 colonial elections held between 8 July 1871 and 6 September 1871
(due to problems of distance and communications, it was not possible to hold the elections on a single day).

See also
Premier:
 Arthur Hunter Palmer (1870–1874)

Notes
 On 29 September 1871, Horace Tozer, member of Wide Bay, resigned to enable for previous member for Wide Bay Henry Edward King (who failed to win Maryborough in the 1871 election) to be re-elected in Wide Bay. On 4 October 1871 King was elected unopposed in the by-election in Wide Bay.
 On 20 October 1871, Henry Jordan, member for East Moreton, resigned. William Hemmant won the resulting by-election on 4 November 1871.
 On 24 October 1871, Berkeley Basil Moreton, member for Burnett, resigned. Walter Jervoise Scott won the resulting by-election on 7 November 1871.
 On 11 January 1872, Ratcliffe Pring, member for Town of Brisbane, resigned. John Handy won the resulting by-election on 27 January 1872.
 On 30 January 1872, Charles Royds, the member for Leichhardt, resigned. His brother Edmund Royds won the resulting by-election on 20 February 1872.
 On 7 March 1872, Robert Travers Atkin, member for East Moreton, resigned due to ill health (he died two months later). Samuel Griffith won the resulting by-election on 3 April 1872.
 On 9 April 1872, Oscar de Satge, the member for Clermont, resigned. Charles Graham won the resulting by-election on 30 April 1872.
 On 9 October 1872, John Johnston, the member for Ipswich, died. Arthur Macalister won the resulting by-election on 22 October 1872.

References

 Alphabetical Register of Members (Queensland Parliament)
 Brisbane Courier variously over 1871–1873

Members of Queensland parliaments by term
19th-century Australian politicians